William Morrow (22 October 1888 – 12 July 1980) was an Australian politician. Born in Rockhampton, Queensland, he received a primary education before becoming a railway worker. Having moved to Tasmania, he was Tasmanian Secretary of the Australian Railways Union 1936–1946. In 1946, he was elected to the Australian Senate as a Labor Senator for Tasmania. He lost his Labor endorsement in 1953 and stood on his own ticket, under the name of "Tasmanian Labor Party". He was defeated, receiving 5.1% of the vote. Morrow died in 1980.

References

Australian Labor Party members of the Parliament of Australia
Members of the Australian Senate for Tasmania
Members of the Australian Senate
1880s births
1980 deaths
Independent members of the Parliament of Australia
20th-century Australian politicians